Marianne Brenton (February 25, 1933 – February 10, 2013) was an American politician who represented the 23rd Middlesex District in the Massachusetts House of Representatives from 1991 to 1997, was a member of the Burlington School Committee from 1972 to 1981, and was a member of the Burlington Ways and Means Committee from 1982 to 1984. She died on February 10, 2013, of natural causes in Haverhill, Massachusetts.

References

1933 births
2013 deaths
Bates College alumni
Republican Party members of the Massachusetts House of Representatives
People from Freeport, Maine
People from Burlington, Massachusetts
Women state legislators in Massachusetts
21st-century American women